BGT may stand for:
Britain's Got Talent, a UK TV programme
Bagdad Airport, Arizona, U.S. IATA code
Diehl BGT Defence, German missile producer
Bonny Gas Transport, a shipping-company owned by Nigeria LNG
Busch Gardens Tampa Bay, a theme park in Tampa, Florida